Allan Richardovich Erdman (born 11 July 1933) is a retired Soviet shooter. He won a silver medal at the 1956 Summer Olympics in the 300 metre rifle three positions event, as well as five national titles (1955–1957, 1963). After retirement he worked as a coach at CSKA Moscow, raising such competitors as the Olympic champion Lyubov Galkina. He was awarded the Order of the Badge of Honour.

References

1933 births
Living people
Soviet male sport shooters
Olympic shooters of the Soviet Union
Shooters at the 1956 Summer Olympics
Olympic silver medalists for the Soviet Union
Olympic medalists in shooting
Medalists at the 1956 Summer Olympics